Morgenlien is a Norwegian surname. Notable people with the surname include:

Holm Sigvald Morgenlien (1909–1995), Norwegian politician
Svein Gunnar Morgenlien (1922–2016), Norwegian trade unionist and politician 

Norwegian-language surnames